William Johnson FRS FREng (20 April 1922 – 13 June 2010)  was a British engineer, educator, research scientist and Professor of Mechanics at the University of Cambridge.

Awards and honours
Johnson was elected a Fellow of the Royal Society in 1982. His nomination reads:

References

1922 births
2010 deaths
Academics of the University of Cambridge
Fellows of the Royal Academy of Engineering
Fellows of the Royal Society
Scientists from Manchester